Fred A. Fredrich (August 23, 1870 – October 9, 1954) was an American farmer and politician.

Born in the town of Maple Grove, Manitowoc County, Wisconsin, Fredrich owned a farm near Reedsville, Wisconsin, in the town of Maple Grove. He was also president of the Rockland Insurance Company. Fredrich served as chairman of the Maple Grove Town Board and as the school district clerk. Fredrich served on the Manitowoc County Board of Supervisor from 1920 until his retirement in 1951; he was also chairman of the county board. From 1923 to 1927, Fredrich served in the Wisconsin State Assembly as a Republican. Fredrich died in a hospital in Green Bay, Wisconsin after a long illness.

References

1870 births
1954 deaths
People from Reedsville, Wisconsin
Businesspeople from Wisconsin
Farmers from Wisconsin
Mayors of places in Wisconsin
School board members in Wisconsin
County supervisors in Wisconsin
People from Manitowoc County, Wisconsin
Republican Party members of the Wisconsin State Assembly